The King's Cup was a professional golf tournament on the Asian Tour that was played in Thailand from 2009 to 2016. The inaugural event was held at the Singha Park Khon Kaen Golf Club with a prize fund of US$300,000.

In 2016, the King's Cup was added to the European Tour schedule.

Winners

Notes

References

External links
Coverage on Asian Tour's official site
Coverage on the European Tour's official site

Former Asian Tour events
Former European Tour events
Golf tournaments in Thailand
Recurring sporting events established in 2009
Recurring sporting events disestablished in 2016